Lilliam Barrios-Paoli is a former New York City government employee.

Life and education
Barrios-Paoli has a baccalaureate degree from Universidad Iberoamericana and a Masters and Ph.D. degree in Cultural and Urban Anthropology from the New School of Social Research. She has taught at the City University of New York, Hunter College, and the Bank Street College of Education in New York City, and Rutgers University and Montclair State College in New Jersey.

Career
Under Rudolph Giuliani, Barrios-Paoli was the City's Commissioner of the Human Resources Administration. She was forced out of the post due to her criticism of moves made by the administration.

In 2008 Barrios-Paoli served as Mayor Michael Bloomberg's Commissioner for the Aging where she oversaw the city's programs for the elderly.

Mayor-elect Bill de Blasio appointed Barrios-Paoli his deputy mayor for health and human services on December 12, 2013. She resigned in September 2015 to become the volunteer chairwoman of the board of the city's Health and Hospitals Corporation—which runs the city’s public hospitals. This announcement came during an ongoing crisis of New York City's homelessness (an area of the Deputy Mayor's purview) and increased media scrutiny of the administration's policies.

References

Year of birth missing (living people)
Living people
Place of birth missing (living people)
Deputy mayors of New York City
Women in New York (state) politics
The New School alumni
Universidad Iberoamericana alumni
21st-century American women